Walter John Victor (July 1, 1917 – October 14, 2014) was an American photographer and World War II veteran.

Biography

He was born in Dupont, Pennsylvania to Frank and Agnes Victor. He later moved to Dawsonville, Georgia. Victor fought at Utah Beach on D-Day, June 6, 1944, serving as a gunsmith for the 9th Infantry Division. His division also assisted the liberation of Dachau concentration camp. Victor was named a Chevalier of the Legion of Honor in May 2010 for his service. He also earned one Silver Star and two Bronze Stars. In 1966, he became a team photographer for the Atlanta Braves. The Braves named the first base camera well at Turner Field for Victor in 2006. Twelve of his photographs are housed in the National Baseball Hall of Fame and Museum. A compilation of his work was included in the book Brave at Heart: The Life and Lens of Walter Victor, published in 2007. Victor was a Master Mason belonging to the Etowah Lodge in Dawsonville, Georgia. He was married to Ruth and had four children. Victor died on October 14, 2014, aged 97, and was interred at Georgia National Cemetery.

References

External links

2014 deaths
People from Luzerne County, Pennsylvania
People from Dawsonville, Georgia
United States Army personnel of World War II
Chevaliers of the Légion d'honneur
Atlanta Braves personnel
20th-century American photographers
American Freemasons
Recipients of the Silver Star
1917 births
Burials in Georgia (U.S. state)
United States Army soldiers
Photographers from Georgia (U.S. state)
Sports photographers
Photographers from Pennsylvania
American war photographers
World War II photographers